Compagnie des Alpes is a French company created in 1989 to operate many ski resorts in Europe. Compagnie des Alpes is a part of Caisse des dépôts et consignations.

History
Compagnie des Alpes was first established in 1989 as a ski resort operator. Since 2001, Compagnie des Alpes's activity has extended to theme parks including the Walibi parks. The Walibi group was a company specializing in the management of amusement parks. Originally constituted around the Walibi amusement park located in Wavre in Belgium, it quickly developed and Walibi has become the name of several parks in Europe. The group was bought three times between 1998 and 2006 to end up in the fold of the leisure parks division of Compagnie des Alpes alongside Parc Astérix and the Grévin Museums. The Walibi parks used to be owned by an independent company, run by Belgian Eddy Meeus. They were then sold off to American company Six Flags; however, due to financial problems, they were sold again to Compagnie des Alpes. The company has plans to expand the Walibi brand of theme parks with five of their current locations expected to be converted into Walibi parks.

Properties

References

External links
 Compagnie des Alpes (English site)

 
Amusement park companies
Companies based in Paris
Companies listed on Euronext Paris